Sarah Bonnell School is a secondary school for girls, in Stratford, London. It was founded in 1769, though has had changes of names and status since then.

History
The school was founded as a charity school and located opposite West Ham Church. In 1873 the school became an independent school charging fees, under the name West Ham High School for Girls. At this time it was in West Ham Lane. In 1905 it moved to The Grove, Stratford. In the 1920s the school became a grammar school. In 1944 it changed its name to Sarah Bonnell Grammar School and moved again, to St. George's Road, Forest Gate. In 1972 Sarah Bonnell Comprehensive School, moved to the former sites of Deanery High School for Girls and Stratford Green Secondary School in Deanery Road and became a fee paying school once again.

In 2017 Sarah Bonnell School converted to academy status. The school is now sponsored by the Newham Community Schools Trust as a comprehensive.

References

External links
  Sarah Bonnell Homepage
 EduBase

Girls' schools in London
Secondary schools in the London Borough of Newham
Educational institutions established in 1769
1769 establishments in England
Academies in the London Borough of Newham
Stratford, London